Radha Bartake is an Indian actress, model and beauty queen.

Early life
Radha was born in 1959 in Military Hospital, Panaji, Goa, India in the year 1959.

Career and pageantry

Miss Goa 1973-1974
At the age of 14, she won Miss Goa in 1973–74.

Femina Miss India
After winning Miss Goa in the year 1973, she participated in Femina Miss India 1974 contest where she came second. She was crowned Femina Teen Princess India and was chosen to represent India at International Teen Princes contest held in Venezuela.

International Teen Princess 1974
After being crowned Femina Teen Princess India 1974 she was sent to International Teen Princess. Where she took first place. She became first Indian to win International Teen Princess. The event was held in Caracas, Venezuela on 27 July 1974.
Seventeen countries participated in the event.

Career as Film Actress
Later she turned as Indian film actress and made Bollywood debut in the film Sajan Bina Suhagan. She worked in many films. She worked in Marathi movies also. She became well known by the name 'Radha' or 'Kasturi'.

Today her fascination for sea shells and pets has become her favourite occupation. Along with her husband she runs a workshop in her home creating beautiful objects, souvenirs, and murals from sea-shells and terracotta. Into interior designing her creations can be viewed at the Taj chain of hotels, Goa handicrafts, Radisson, etc.

Personal life
In 1986, she married Captain R. K. Malik. She has two sons Sankalp Malik and Jaisinh Malik.

Filmography
After completing her reign as International Teen Princess she returned to India and worked in several films and TV ads.
 Bhuierantlo Munis (1977) Konkani Film
 Saajan Bina Suhagan (1978) as Basanti Chopra
 Aao Pyaar Karen
 ''Daasi (1981 film)
 Preet Tujhi Mhaji
 Pukar (1983) as Anjali

References

External links
 

1959 births
Actresses from Goa
Indian beauty pageant winners
Living people
Femina Miss India winners
People from Margao
Female models from Goa